Manfred Möck (born 14 February 1959) is a German actor. He has appeared in over 80 films and television shows since 1982. He starred in the 1988 film Bear Ye One Another's Burden and with co-star Jörg Pose, won the Silver Bear for Best Actor at the 38th Berlin International Film Festival.

Selected filmography
 Bear Ye One Another's Burden (1988)

References

External links

1959 births
Living people
People from Sangerhausen
German male film actors
German male television actors
Silver Bear for Best Actor winners
20th-century German male actors
21st-century German male actors